Sun Run can refer to:

Vancouver Sun Run, an annual 10 km run in Vancouver, Canada
An Explorer Scouts event
Sun Run (Ararat River tributary), a stream in Patrick County, Virginia

See also
Sunrun